Chicoreus boucheti is a species of sea snail, a marine gastropod mollusk in the family Muricidae, the murex snails or rock snails.

Description
 Size 2–4 cm

Distribution
This marine species occurs off New Caledonia

References

External links
 Houart, R., 1983. Three new tropical muricacean species (Gastropoda: Muricidae). Venus 42(1): 26-33

Gastropods described in 1983
Chicoreus